Moosonee Airport  is located  north-east of Moosonee, Ontario, Canada.

The Moosonee Airport was officially opened in May 1970 and a new terminal building was constructed in July 1991, which houses the airport management office and washrooms. There are several small buildings and hangars at the airport. There are no other facilities at the airport.

The airport handles propeller or turbo prop aircraft only and helicopters from two helipads next to the terminal building.

Airlines and destinations

Tenants
 CHC Helicopter and Wabusk Air for ORNGE

See also
 Moosonee Water Aerodrome

References

External links

 Moosonee Airport

Moosonee
Certified airports in Cochrane District